The National Hispanic Leadership Agenda (NHLA) is a non-profit leadership association. Established in 1991, the group consists of Hispanic leaders and national organizations throughout the United States. It is a nonpartisan organization that works to identify and analyze public policy issues affecting the Latino community.

Member organizations
ASPIRA Association, Inc. 
Cuban American National Council
Hispanic Association of Colleges and Universities
Hispanic Federation
Hispanic National Bar Association
Labor Council for Latin American Advancement
League of United Latin American Citizens
MANA, A National Latina Organization
Mexican American Legal Defense & Educational Fund
National Association of Hispanic Federal Executives
National Association of Hispanic Publications
National Association of Latino Elected and Appointed Officials
National Conference of Puerto Rican Women
National Council of La Raza
National Hispana Leadership Institute
National Hispanic Council on Aging
National Hispanic Environmental Council
National Hispanic Foundation for the Arts
National Hispanic Caucus of State Legislators
National Hispanic Media Coalition
National Hispanic Medical Association
National Institute for Latino Policy
National Puerto Rican Coalition
Self Reliance Foundation
Southwest Voter Registration Education Project
United States Hispanic Chamber of Commerce
United States-Mexico Chamber of Commerce
U.S. Hispanic Leadership Institute

See also
American GI Forum
Congressional Hispanic Caucus
Congressional Hispanic Conference
National Hispanic Institute

References

External links
Official website

Hispanic and Latino American organizations
Organizations established in 1991
1991 establishments in the United States